Denis Clarke (born 10 April 1959) is an Irish former football player who played as a forward.

He started his career at Finn Harps ( 6 total games) after returning home from City, making his League of Ireland debut on 23 October 1977. He moved to his hometown club later that season and joined Shamrock Rovers in 1982. During his time in the Hoops he played in four UEFA Cup games including a League of Ireland record 7–0 aggregate win over Fram Reykjavik. In September 1983 he sought a move from Glenmalure Park.

He rejoined Athlone Town in November 1983.

From there he signed for Limerick City in May 1986.

However, he only lasted half a season before rejoining Athlone for a third time and getting sent off on his third return.

Clarke managed Athlone twice. In November 1995 he was appointed caretaker manager of Galway United. In April 1996 he signed a 3-year full-time contract as manager. In 2012, Clarke managed Willow Park F.C. U’10's up until 2017 when he departed after the U16 season.

Honours

As a player
League of Ireland: 2
 Athlone Town A.F.C. – 1980–81, 1982–83
League of Ireland First Division
 Athlone Town A.F.C. – 1987–88
League of Ireland Cup: 2
 Athlone Town A.F.C. – 1979–80, 1981–82
 Leinster Senior Cup
 Athlone Town 1987/88
 Dublin City Cup
 Shamrock Rovers 1983/84

As a manager
League of Ireland Cup
 Galway United F.C. – 1996/97

Sources 
 The Hoops by Paul Doolan and Robert Goggins

Association football midfielders
Republic of Ireland association footballers
Republic of Ireland youth international footballers
Finn Harps F.C. players
Athlone Town A.F.C. players
Shamrock Rovers F.C. players
Limerick F.C. players
Galway United F.C. players
Athlone Town A.F.C. managers
Galway United F.C. managers
League of Ireland players
League of Ireland XI players
League of Ireland managers
People from Athlone
Living people
1959 births
Republic of Ireland football managers